Merneptah or Merenptah (reigned July or August 1213 BC – May 2, 1203 BC) was the fourth pharaoh of the Nineteenth Dynasty of Ancient Egypt. He ruled Egypt for almost ten years, from late July or early August 1213 BC until his death on May 2, 1203 BC, according to contemporary historical records. He was the thirteenth son of Ramesses II, only coming to power because all of his older brothers had died, including his full brother Khaemwaset or Khaemwase.

By the time he ascended to the throne, he was around seventy years old. He is arguably best known for his victory stele, featuring the first known mention of the name Israel. His throne name was Ba-en-re Mery-netjeru, which means "The Soul of Ra, Beloved of the Gods".

Family
Merneptah was likely the fourth child born to Isetnofret I and Ramesses II, and his thirteenth son in total. He married Isetnofret II, who was likely his full sister or niece, and she would be his Great Royal Wife when he became pharaoh. They had at least two sons, Merenptah and Seti, and a daughter, Twosret. When Seti became pharaoh, his sister Twosret was his Great Royal Wife; she would eventually become pharaoh in her own right.

Takhat, the mother of Amenmesse, may have been a secondary queen, though scholars are yet to confirm this.

Prior to accession
Ramesses II lived well into his nineties and was one of the oldest pharaohs in Egyptian history, if not the oldest. He outlived many of his heirs and eventually Merneptah would be the son to succeed him. Merneptah would have been prepared to be pharaoh through the responsibility of his government roles. By Year 40, Merneptah had been promoted to Overseer of the Army. In Year 55, he was officially proclaimed crown prince. At that point, he gained additional responsibilities by serving as Prince Regent for the last twelve years of Ramesses II's life.

Chronology

According to one reading of contemporary historical records, Merneptah ruled Egypt for almost ten years, from late July or early August 1213 BC until his death on 2 May 1203 BC.

Campaigns

Merneptah had to carry out several military campaigns during his reign. In the fifth year of his rule, he fought against the Libyans, who—with the assistance of the Sea Peoples—were threatening Egypt from the west. Merneptah led a victorious six-hour battle against a combined Libyan and Sea People force at the city of Perire, probably located on the western edge of the Nile delta. His account of this campaign against the Sea Peoples and Libu is described in prose on a wall beside the sixth pylon at Karnak, which states:

 [Beginning of the victory that his majesty achieved in the land of Libya] -I, Ekwesh, Teresh, Lukka, Sherden, Shekelesh, Northerners coming from all lands.

Later in the inscription, Merneptah receives news of the attack:

 ...the third season, saying: 'The wretched, fallen chief of Libya, Meryre, son of Ded, has fallen upon the country of Tehenu with his bowmen--Sherden, Shekelesh, Ekwesh, Lukka, Teresh, Taking the best of every warrior and every man of war of his country. He has brought his wife and his children--leaders of the camp, and he has reached the western boundary in the fields of Perire.'

An inscription on the Athribis Stele, now in the garden of Cairo Museum, declares "His majesty was enraged at their report, like a lion", assembled his court, and gave a rousing speech. Later he dreamed he saw Ptah handing him a sword and saying "Take thou (it) and banish thou the fearful heart from thee." When the bowmen went forth, says the inscription, "Amun was with them as a shield." After six hours the surviving Nine Bows threw down their weapons, abandoned their baggage and dependents, and ran for their lives. Merneptah states that he defeated the invasion, killing 6,000 soldiers and taking 9,000 prisoners. To be sure of the numbers, among other things, he took the penises of all uncircumcised enemy dead and the hands of all the circumcised, from which history learns that the Ekwesh were circumcised, a fact causing some to doubt that they were Greek.

There is also an account of the same events in the form of a poem from the Merneptah Stele, widely known as the Israel Stele, which mentions the suppression of revolts in Canaan and makes reference to the supposed utter destruction of Israel in a campaign prior to his fifth year, in Canaan: "Israel has been wiped out...its seed is no more." This is the first recognised ancient Egyptian record of the existence of Israel--"not as a country or city, but as a tribe" or people. A newly discovered massive layer of fiery destruction confirms Merneptah's boast about his Canaanite campaign.

Succession

Merneptah was already an elderly man in his late 60s, if not early 70s, when he assumed the throne. Merneptah moved the administrative center of Egypt from Piramesse (Pi-Ramesses), his father's capital, back to Memphis, where he constructed a royal palace next to the temple of Ptah. This palace was excavated in 1915 by the University of Pennsylvania Museum, led by Clarence Stanley Fisher.

Merneptah's successor, Seti II, was a son of Queen Isetnofret. However, Seti II's accession to the throne was not unchallenged: a rival king named Amenmesse, who was either another son of Merneptah by Takhat or, much less likely, of Ramesses II, seized control of Upper Egypt and Kush during the middle of the reign of Seti II. Only after he overcame Amenmesse, was Seti able to reassert his authority over Thebes in his fifth year. It is possible that before seizing Upper Egypt, Amenmesse had been known as Messuy and had been viceroy of Kush.

Mummy

Merneptah suffered from arthritis and atherosclerosis and died as an old man after a reign that lasted for nearly a decade. He was originally buried within tomb KV8 in the Valley of the Kings, but his mummy was not found there. In 1898 it was located along with eighteen other mummies in the mummy cache found in the tomb of Amenhotep II (KV35) by Victor Loret. His mummy was taken to Cairo and eventually unwrapped by Dr. G. Elliott Smith on July 8, 1907. Dr. Smith notes that:
The body is that of an old man and is 1 meter 714 millimeters [5'6"] in height. Merneptah was almost completely bald, only a narrow fringe of white hair (now cut so close as to be seen only with difficulty) remaining on the temples and occiput. A few short (about 2 mill) black hairs were found on the upper lip and scattered, closely clipped hairs on the cheeks and chin. The general aspect of the face recalls that of Ramesses II, but the form of the cranium and the measurements of the face much more nearly agree with those of his [grand]father, Seti the Great.

In 1980, James Harris and Edward F. Wente conducted a series of X-ray examinations on New Kingdom Pharaohs crania and skeletal remains, which included the mummified remains of Mereneptah. The analysis in general found strong similarities between the New Kingdom rulers of the 19th Dynasty and 20th Dynasty with Mesolithic Nubian samples. The authors also noted affinities with modern Mediterranean populations of Levantine origin. Harris and Wente suggested this represented admixture as the Rammessides were of northern origin.

In April 2021 his mummy was moved from the Museum of Egyptian Antiquities to the National Museum of Egyptian Civilization along with those of 17 other kings and 4 queens in an event termed the Pharaohs' Golden Parade.

See also
 List of children of Ramesses II

References

Further reading
Eva March Tappan, ed., The World's Story: A History of the World in Story, Song, and Art, (Boston: Houghton Mifflin, 1914), Vol. III: Egypt, Africa, and Arabia, trans. W. K. Flinders Petrie, pp. 47–55, scanned by J. S. Arkenberg, Department of History, California State Fullerton; Professor Arkenberg has modernized the text and it is available via Internet Ancient History Sourcebook

13th-century BC births
1203 BC deaths
13th-century BC Pharaohs
Pharaohs of the Nineteenth Dynasty of Egypt
Ancient Egyptian mummies
Ramesses II
Year of birth unknown
Children of Ramesses II